NG-12, previously known as OA-12, was the thirteenth flight of the Northrop Grumman robotic resupply spacecraft Cygnus and its twelfth Commercial Resupply Services flight to the International Space Station (ISS) for NASA. The mission launched on 2 November 2019 at 13:59:47 UTC). This was the first launch of Cygnus under the Commercial Resupply Services 2 (CRS-2) contract.

Orbital ATK and NASA jointly developed a new space transportation system to provide commercial cargo resupply services to the International Space Station (ISS). Under the Commercial Orbital Transportation Services (COTS) program, then Orbital Sciences designed and built Antares, a medium-class launch vehicle; Cygnus, an advanced maneuvering spacecraft, and a Pressurized Cargo Module which is provided by Orbital's industrial partner Thales Alenia Space. Northrop Grumman purchased Orbital ATK in June 2018; its ATK division was renamed Northrop Grumman Innovation Systems.

History 
Cygnus NG-12 was the first mission under the Commercial Resupply Services 2 contract and launched 2 November 2019 at 13:59:47 UTC.

Spacecraft 

Production and integration of Cygnus spacecraft is performed in Dulles, Virginia. The Cygnus service module is mated with the pressurized cargo module at the launch site, and mission operations are conducted from control centers at Dulles, Virginia and Houston, Texas. This is the eighth flight of the Enhanced-sized Cygnus PCM.

In 2019, the spacecraft was named the S.S. Alan Bean.

Manifest 
 Crew supplies: 
 Science investigations: 
 Spacewalk equipment: 
 Vehicle hardware: 
 Computer resources: 
 Russian hardware: 
 Northrop Grumman-related equipment: 

Among the cargo delivered was a special made oven for use in space, and some cookie dough. The crew of ISS attempt to use the device to bake chocolate chip cookies in space (a first time for this kind of space activity). The baking of cookies in space attracted some international media attention when the mission was arriving at the space station.

Another research-related item delivered is the AstroRad radiation protective vest, which astronauts will wear to determine the degree of flexibility and freedom of movements experienced by them while working with these vests. This feedback will be used to possibly improve the comfort and ergonomics of the radiation vests if needed. AstroRad is useful in significantly reducing the short-term deterministic effects such as acute radiation syndrome and the probability of stochastic effects such as cancer in long-term ex-LEO missions.

The Houston Methodist Institute, in collaboration with Lamborghini sent some carbon fiber reinforced polymers aboard the mission. The project seeks to leverage the harsh space environment to test the performance of five proprietary carbon fiber materials, including forged and 3D-printed carbon fiber composites, developed by Lamborghini for aerospace applications. The research team will assess the ability of the materials to withstand exposure to temperature fluctuations, radiation, and atomic oxygen.

Cygnus NG-12 tested the Cygnus External Payload Carrier which is used to deliver external payloads to the station or remove degraded ones. SOLAR  and the SDS were the first payloads transferred to the spacecraft for disposal.

Extension 
Northrop Grumman's customer with a payload on the Cygnus (Lynk) sought extra time in orbit, a request that the Federal Communications Commission (FCC) approved on 3 March 2020. The FCC approval provided the potential to extend this testing until as late as 2 April 2020. "The extension of our license by the FCC allows Northrop Grumman to extend our NG-12 mission beyond our original completion date, enabling us to offer increased operational flexibility for our customers". Frank DeMauro, vice president and general manager of Tactical Space at Northrop Grumman, said in the statement. "The NG-12 spacecraft remains in excellent health as we carry out a few more weeks of in-orbit operations".

The spacecraft was deorbited at about 23:00 UTC on 17 March 2020.

See also 
 Uncrewed spaceflights to the International Space Station

References 

Cygnus (spacecraft)
Supply vehicles for the International Space Station
Spacecraft launched in 2019
Spacecraft launched by Antares rockets
Spacecraft which reentered in 2020